Peter William Geoffrey Newman  (born 1945) is an environmental scientist, author and educator based in Perth, Western Australia. He is currently Professor of Sustainability at Curtin University. He is best known for his contributions to the development of Perth’s electrified metropolitan rail network through both activist and official consulting roles since the 1980s. 

Newman has written 20 books and over 330 papers on sustainable cities and is most known for creating the term "automobile dependence" in the second half of the 1980s. He was closely associated with community opposition to the closure of the Fremantle Railway in 1979 and subsequent redevelopment of the metropolitan rail system from 1983 to the present. He is a lead author for transport on the Intergovernmental Panel on Climate Change.

He has a PhD degree in Chemistry (1972, University of Western Australia) and completed post doctoral studies in Environmental Science, Delft University, Dip EST, Environmental Science, 1972.

Career and influence
Newman is best known internationally for popularizing the term ‘automobile dependence’ in the second half of the 1980s to explain how the cities of the time based on sprawling suburbs were inevitably leading to the growth in automobile use.  He led an international research project with colleague Jeff Kenworthy on transport practices and structures (original data collected on 33 global cities). The results were published in Cities and Automobile Dependence: An International Sourcebook,  which introduced the concept of car dependence –  now a feature of planning literature and policy.  The two researchers later collaborated on the book Sustainability and Cities: Overcoming Automobile Dependence which was launched in the White House in 1999, as the President's Council on Sustainable Development was moving toward a more urban focus, and more recently The End of Automobile Dependence: How Cities are Moving Beyond Car-based Planning.

In Cities as Sustainable Ecosystems: Principles and Practices written with Isabella Jennings, Newman shows how city residents can begin to reintegrate into their bioregional environment, and how cities themselves can be planned with ecological sustainability in mind. Drawing on examples from many parts of the world, the authors show how urban redevelopment in some cities has involved harvesting rainwater, greening roofs, and producing renewable energy. Other cities have biodiversity parks for endangered species, community gardens that support a connection to their foodshed, and pedestrian-friendly spaces that encourage walking and cycling.

Local, State and Federal Government
Between 1976–80 Newman has served as a local government councillor in the City of Fremantle. Newman has been a government advisor through three secondments to the Western Australian State Government. In the last secondment (2001–03), he was the Director of Sustainability Policy in the Department of Premier and Cabinet where he managed and wrote the State Sustainability Strategy: the first in the world at the state/province level. In 2004–2005 he was the New South Wales Sustainability Commissioner.

Between 2008 and 2014 he was a member of Infrastructure Australia.

Academia
From 1989 to 2007 Newman was Director of the Institute for Sustainability and Technology Policy, Murdoch University in Murdoch, Western Australia. In 2007, Newman left Murdoch University to join Curtin University. In 2006–07 he was a Fulbright Scholar at the University of Virginia, Charlottesville.

International advisor
Peter Newman is a member of the Global Research Network on Human Settlements Advisory Board and the Scientific Advisory Committee of the UNESCO SCOPE Ecopolis Project. He is Senior Consultant at Gehl Architects, Copenhagen, Denmark.

Honors and recognition
Murdoch University 25th Anniversary Special Service Medallion. (2000)
Centenary Medal by the Australian Government in 2001 for Planning and Sustainability.
Officer of the Order of Australia in 2014 for services to sustainable transport and urban design.

Publications
1989 Cities and Automobile Dependence: An International Sourcebook, Newman P and Kenworthy J,  Gower, Aldershot.
1992 Winning Back the Cities, Pluto Press, Sydney, Newman P and Kenworthy J.
1999 Sustainability and Cities: Overcoming Automobile Dependence, Island Press, Washington DC. Newman P and Kenworthy J, .
1999 An International Sourcebook of Automobile Dependence in Cities, 1960–1990, Kenworthy J, Laube F and Newman P, University of Colorado Press, Boulder, 1999.
2001 Back on Track: Rethinking Australia and New Zealand Transport Policy,  Laird P, Newman P, Kenworthy J and Bachels M, UNSW Press, Sydney, 2001.
2003 Hope for the Future: The Western Australian State Sustainability Strategy, Department of the Premier and Cabinet, WA Government, Perth, 2003.
2008 Cities as Sustainable Ecosystems: Principles and Practices with Isabella Jennings, Washington, DC: Island Press, .
2008 Green Urbanism Down Under: Learning from Sustainable Communities in Australia  with Timothy Beatley, Island Press, 
2009 Resilient Cities with Timothy Beatley and Heather Boyer, Island Press, 
2013 Green Urbanism in Asia with Anne Matan, World Scientific Publishing.
2015 The End of Automobile Dependence, with Kenworthy J, Island Press.
2016 'People Cities: The Life and Legacy of Jan Gehl', with Annie Matan, Island Press.
2017 'Resilient Cities: Overcoming fossil fuel dependence' with Timothy Beatley and Heather Boyer, Island Press.

See also
 Marchetti's Constant
 Transit-oriented development

References

External links 

 Professor Newman's Curtin profile

1945 births
Academic staff of Curtin University
Delft University of Technology alumni
Australian ecologists
Environmental scientists
Futurologists
Living people
Australian environmentalists
University of Western Australia alumni
Sustainable transport pioneers
Officers of the Order of Australia